Raúl Morón Orozco (born 25 October 1958) is a Mexican politician affiliated with the MORENA. He currently serves as Mayor of Morelia, Michoacán. He served in the LXIX and LXXI Legislatures of the Congress of Michoacán.

See also
 List of municipal presidents of Morelia

References

1958 births
Living people
Politicians from Michoacán
Members of the Senate of the Republic (Mexico)
Party of the Democratic Revolution politicians
21st-century Mexican politicians
Members of the Congress of Michoacán
Senators of the LXII and LXIII Legislatures of Mexico